The American Review was a magazine of politics and literature established by the fascist publisher Seward Collins in 1933. There were 71 issues published, containing articles, editorials, notes, and reviews, before the journal ceased operations in October 1937.

Formation
Before he founded The American Review, Collins was editor of The Bookman, a New York-based literary magazine that had changed hands multiple times since its launch in 1895. Under his editorship, The Bookman increasingly reflected Collins's conservative and pro-Fascist political views. Upon establishing the Review in 1933, he ceased publication of The Bookman, which he regarded as the former's predecessor.

With the Review, Collins made his political aims more explicit, intending to counter the problems he saw in American politics and economics. To do so he brought together the writings and opinions of four loosely compatible traditionalist groups: the British Distributists, the Neo-scholastics, the New Humanists, and the Agrarians, with whom Collins would have the closest relationship.

To manage the composition and production of the journal Collins employed a small staff. For most of the run of the journal its editors were Geoffrey Stone, Marvin McCord Lowes, Dorothea Brande, and Collins, with the influence and assistance of political actors and literary figures like Allen Tate.

Political advocacy
Collins commissioned the majority of The American Review's political content rather than relying on unsolicited submissions. As a result, the journal reflected his traditionalist polemics, for which he said he was "willing to incur the charge of being fanatical and extreme – to publish and write more extreme stuff than I actually whole-heartedly accept – in order to help define and clarify issues." His commissioning enabled the Review to maintain a consistency of voice that had not been possible at more liberal publications, and his attempt to synthesize multiple otherwise disparate conservative movements into an antimodernist coherent whole has attracted much scholarly interest.

The journal quickly became known for its publication of reactionary and even pro-fascist essays and editorials. Its debut issue included an article by Harold Goad in praise of the fascist political structure then in place in Italy and an editorial note from Collins advertising future coverage of "Fascist economics ... which have received scant treatment by our universally liberal and radical press." Still, the four political entities and Collins maintained a productive, if not always agreeable, relationship via the Review for most of the publication's relatively short life.

Controversy and decline
Collins himself was provocative in public as well as in print, expressing a number of unpopular opinions on politics and society. The extreme nature of some of his positions, or at least his presentation of them, drove collaborators away. An interview with FIGHT against War and Fascism's Grace Lumpkin was particularly damaging. Collins responded to one of the interviewer's questions by affirming: "Yes, I am a fascist. I admire Hitler and Mussolini very much" and went on to say he did not consider Hitler's treatment of Jews "persecution" because "The Jews make trouble" and "It is necessary to segregate them." Although he took exception to Lumpkin's use of his comments to paint the Agrarians as fascist in nature, he had already been accused of antisemitism and of supporting a version of fascism in America, and so stood by his statements.

The Agrarians immediately began to distance themselves from the Review and eventually broke ties with Collins. A number of other contributors, embarrassed by the incident, claimed ignorance or outrage that their work had been used in the service of a broader political mission which had at its core certain principles they did not agree with. The Agrarian and journalist Herbert Agar became one of Collins's most vehement detractors. In an interview with Marxist Quarterly he said it was "illogical" for anyone to be associated with The American Review and at the same time claim to oppose fascism, and furthermore that he "would not, now that its policies have become unmistakably clear, write a piece for The American Review if it were the last publication left in America – as it might become if America goes fascist!"

By the end of 1936 most of the important contributors to the journal had distanced themselves from it. It became more difficult for Collins to continue and in 1937, after he opened what he called "New York's only Right-wing bookshop", The American Review ceased publication.

Notable contributors

The American Review featured the work of a range of socially conscious essayists, critics, poets, novelists, scholars, historians, and journalists. Although Collins viewed all of their work as complementary to his own ideology, most on this list are not otherwise known to have shared the same views on fascism or race, and many explicitly condemned the same.

References

Conservative magazines published in the United States
Defunct literary magazines published in the United States
Fascism in the United States
Fascist newspapers and magazines
Magazines established in 1933
Magazines disestablished in 1937
Monthly magazines published in the United States